Kacy Rodgers (born June 24, 1969) is an American football coach for the Tampa Bay Buccaneers of the National Football League (NFL).  He played college football for the University of Tennessee and was a part of the Pittsburgh Steelers practice squad in the NFL in 1992. Since then, Rodgers has served as an assistant coach at the college and professional levels.

Early years
Rodgers played high school football for and graduated from Humboldt High School in Humboldt, Tennessee.  He and wife, Marcella Cruze, have one son, Kacy II,  a former professional football player for the New York Jets and current Real Estate mogul.

College career
Rodgers then attended the University of Tennessee, where he was a four-year letterman for the Tennessee Volunteers football team from 1988 to 1991.  He was an honorable mention All-SEC selection. During his time as a linebacker and defensive end, he won two SEC championships and played in the 1990 Cotton Bowl Classic, 1991 Sugar Bowl and the 1992 Fiesta Bowl.

Professional playing career
Rodgers signed with the Pittsburgh Steelers as an undrafted free agent in 1992. He played for the Shreveport Pirates of the Canadian Football League in 1994.

Coaching career

University of Tennessee at Martin
Rodgers began his coaching career in 1994 as defensive line coach for the University of Tennessee at Martin. He held the title for three seasons before adding the title of assistant head coach in 1997.

Northeast Louisiana
After his time at Tennessee-Martin, Rodgers served one season as defensive line coach for the Northeast Louisiana University in 1998.

Middle Tennessee State
In 1999, Rodgers became defensive line coach at Middle Tennessee State University. He held the title for three seasons and was also the assistant head coach for the final two. In 2001, the Blue Raiders posted an 8-3 record and were co-champions of the Sun Belt Conference. Also that season, the team tied for first in the conference with 27 sacks.

Arkansas
Rodgers then served one season as defensive line coach for the University of Arkansas in 2002. The Razorbacks defense ranked second in the SEC and 18th in the nation, going 9-5 and earning an SEC Championship berth.

Dallas Cowboys
In 2003, Arkansas alum and Dallas Cowboys owner Jerry Jones hired Rodgers as the team's defensive tackles coach. He held the title for two seasons before serving the next three as defensive line coach. Defensive tackle La'Roi Glover earned three Pro Bowl selections under Rodgers' tutelage from 2003 to 2005. The Cowboys' defense also ranked in the top 10 in the NFL during four of Rodgers' five seasons with the team. During his final season in 2007, they ranked No. 6 in the NFL and allowed just 94.6 rushing yards per game.

Miami Dolphins
In 2008, Rodgers joined the Miami Dolphins as defensive line coach under first-year head coach Tony Sparano, replacing Travis Jones and Diron Reynolds from 2007. He would churn out three pro bowlers in Randy Starks DT, Paul Soliai DT and Cameron Wake DE while with the Dolphins. Rodgers had previously worked with Sparano in Dallas the previous five seasons while also serving under former Dolphins Vice President Bill Parcells during his tenure as Cowboys head coach from 2003 to 2006.

New York Jets
Rodgers was named the New York Jets' defensive coordinator on January 23, 2015.

Tampa Bay Buccaneers 
In 2019, Rodgers was named defensive line coach of the Tampa Bay Buccaneers, a position he held for three seasons. He was part of the coaching staff when the Buccaneers won Super Bowl LV. Following the 2021 season, Rodgers was promoted to co-defensive coordinator (with Larry Foote) due to existing defensive coordinator Todd Bowles being named new Buccaneers head coach, replacing the retiring Bruce Arians who moved into a front office position with the team.

References

External links
 Tampa Bay Buccaneers bio

1969 births
Living people
American football defensive ends
American football linebackers
American players of Canadian football
Arkansas Razorbacks football coaches
Canadian football linebackers
Dallas Cowboys coaches
Louisiana–Monroe Warhawks football coaches
Miami Dolphins coaches
Middle Tennessee Blue Raiders football coaches
New York Jets coaches
People from Humboldt, Tennessee
Pittsburgh Steelers players
Shreveport Pirates players
UT Martin Skyhawks football coaches
Tennessee Volunteers football players
National Football League defensive coordinators
Tampa Bay Buccaneers coaches